Aigle Royal Football Club is a Gabonese football club based in Libreville, Gabon. The club currently plays in Gabon Championnat National D2

In 1968 and 1969 the team has won the Gabon Championnat National D1.

Stadium
Currently the team plays at the 7000 capacity Stade Augustin Monédan de Sibang.

Honours
Gabon Championnat National D1
Champion (2): 1968, 1969

Performance in CAF competitions
CAF Champions League: 1 appearance
1970 – First Round

References

External links
Gabon Campionato – calciopedia.org

Football clubs in Gabon